Seltsi may refer to:

 Selckë, a village near Gjirokastër, Albania
 Seltsi, Bulgaria, a village near Sadovo, Bulgaria

See also
 Selci (disambiguation)